Warehouse Economy Outlet, (W.E.O), Where Economy Originates, was a discount, warehouse-style supermarket concept that was developed in the 1970s by The Great Atlantic & Pacific Tea Company (A&P), and is credited with being among the first of its kind in the industry. The first W.E.O. opened in Pennsauken, New Jersey in 1971, and quickly became a successful, profitable venture. W.E.O. featured top-selling grocery items in their original wholesale bulk packaging at greatly reduced prices. In 1972 A&P expanded this format to 1,500 stores; however, the expansion failed because many of its older stores, built prior to the 1950s, were not large enough to stock the large quantities of discounted groceries that the format called for. By 1975, A&P abandoned the format.

Company slogans
 "Weeee-oooo! How A&P prices have changed!" 
 "A WOW is not a Weeee-oooo!" 
 "We Won't Stop Trying Til You Say Weeee-oooo!"

References 

The Great Atlantic & Pacific Tea Company
American companies established in 1971
American companies disestablished in 1975
Retail companies established in 1971
Retail companies disestablished in 1975
Companies based in Bergen County, New Jersey
Companies based in Manhattan
Defunct companies based in New Jersey
Defunct companies based in New York (state)
Defunct discount stores of the United States
Defunct discount stores based in New Jersey
Defunct supermarkets of the United States
1971 establishments in the United States
1975 disestablishments in the United States